= Bambadinka =

Coordinates: 13°34′N 13°25′W

- Interactive map of Bambadinka
- Country: Senegal
- Time zone: UTC+0 (GMT)

Bambadinka is a settlement in Senegal.
